Greatest Hits is a compilation album by Spanish pop singer Enrique Iglesias. The album contains Enrique's greatest hits from his four English studio albums, as well as two newly recorded tracks – "Away", featuring Sean Garrett, and the hit single "Takin' Back My Love", featuring Ciara, which reached the top ten in numerous countries. The German version of the song features Sarah Connor, and the French version features Tyssem.

On 4 October 2019, the second Greatest Hits album by Enrique Iglesias was released under the same name. The new album featured Enrique's hits spanning Iglesias' music career spanning from Enrique Iglesias to Sex and Love.

Track listing

  signifies a vocal producer
  signifies a co-producer

Charts

Weekly charts

Year-end charts

Certifications and sales

References

External links
Enrique Iglesias official site
Enrique Iglesias Greatest Hits: Amazon

Enrique Iglesias compilation albums
Enrique Iglesias video albums
2008 greatest hits albums
2008 video albums
Music video compilation albums
Albums produced by Brian Rawling
Albums produced by David Foster